Victor Caire is a French animator and filmmaker, best known for his computer-animated short film, Garden Party  (2017), for which he received critical acclaim and was co-nominated for Academy Award for Best Animated Short Film at 90th Academy Awards.

Victor Caire is co-founder of Illogic Studios.

Filmography 
 2017: Garden Party (Short) (director, sound editor)

References

External links
 
 

1993 births
Living people
French film producers
French film directors